The Monastery of Santa Maria de Valldigna is located in Simat de la Valldigna (Valencia).

History
The monastery was founded in 1297 by James II of Aragon. Since the beginning, it was one of the most important monasteries of the Cistercian order. It was founded by the monks of Santes Creus in the Tarragona province. The whole Valldigna valley belonged to the monks, according to a royal order.

The monastery was inhabited by monks until 1835, when a revolt in the Valldigna valley took place after the Ecclesiastical Confiscations of Mendizábal. After that, the monks were forced to abandon the monastery. Most of its goods and works of art were sold, plundered or destroyed.

This ancient Cistercian monastery was neglected and in ruins, until the Generalitat Valenciana (Valencian Government) began a process of restoration.

After decades of abandonment, now the monastery of Santa Maria de Valldigna is, according to the 57th article of the Statute of Autonomy of the Valencian Community, "the spiritual, historical and cultural temple of the ancient Kingdom of Valencia. It is as well a symbol of the grandeur of the Valencian people". The same article states that "the Generalitat Valenciana will recover, restore and preserve the monastery (...) a law from the Valencian Parliament will determine the destiny and usage of the monastery as a meeting point of all Valencians, and as a research center for the recovery of the Valencian Community history".

See also

Monastery of Sant Jeroni de Cotalba
Route of the Monasteries of Valencia
Route of the Borgias

References

External links

Website of the Monastery and the Fundación Jaume II el Just

Monasteries in the Valencian Community
Bien de Interés Cultural landmarks in the Province of Valencia
1297 establishments in Europe
Route of the Borgias
Valldigna
Spanish confiscation
Churches in the Valencian Community
13th-century establishments in Aragon